The motor vessel MV Mamutu was an Australian merchant ship built in Hong Kong in 1938. She operated on an inter-island trade route for Burns Philp & Company, and at the outbreak of World War II, she was engaged in the evacuation of civilians ahead of advancing Japanese forces in New Guinea. The Mamutu sunk in August 1942 after being attacked by a Japanese submarine  in the Gulf of Papua near Murray Island.

History
With the onset of war, Mamutu served as a Royal Australian Navy stores ship during 1941, returning to customary resupply duty in January 1942. On 7 August 1942, she was sunk by enemy action in the Gulf of Papua near Murray Island, Torres Strait, with the loss of 114 lives. Twenty-seven persons were thought to have survived by drifting to the coast on air-delivered life rafts, while one person was taken back to Port Moresby by a Royal Australian Air Force rescue plane.

The following account of Mamutus loss is drawn from the book Battle Surface- Japan's Submarine War Against Australia 1942-1944 by David Jenkins, published by Random House Australia in 1992:

The submarine trailing Mamutu was a RO-33 class submarine under the command of Lieutenant Commander Shigeshi Kuriyama. At 300 metres [330 yards], he gave the order to fire. The first shell ripped into the radio room, killing Furbank; the second shot carried away the bridge, killing Captain J. McEachern. Other shells tore into the hull. Within minutes, Mamutu was a scene of carnage with dead and dying littering the decks. Kuriyama then ordered his gunners to open fire with 13mm gunfire as survivors struggled in the water; men, women and children. He then retired, leaving Mamutu a sinking hull and most of her complement dead.

There were only 28 survivors from the total complement of 120 persons. One man, a European engineer named Bill Griffin, escaped death at the hands of the machine gunners by pretending to be dead.

A United States Army Air Forces B-17 Flying Fortress search aircraft dropped life rafts to the struggling survivors, who eventually made it to shore. The Australian Army signal ship MV Reliance, which was used by the Coastwatchers, was sent from Murray Island to try to pick up the survivors but was unable to locate them.

Postscript
On 29 August 1942,  torpedoed the Burns Philp ship Malaita (3,310 tons gross) as she left Port Moresby, New Guinea. Malaita under escort by the Australian destroyer  under the command of Commander J.C. Morrow.

References

External links
 

Merchant ships of Australia
Japanese war crimes
Maritime incidents in August 1942
World War II shipwrecks in the Pacific Ocean
Auxiliary ships of the Royal Australian Navy
Ships built in Hong Kong
Ships sunk by Japanese submarines